Sextillion may mean either of the two numbers (see long and short scales for more detail):
 1,000,000,000,000,000,000,000 (one thousand million million million; 1021; SI prefix zetta-) for all short scale countries
 1,000,000,000,000,000,000,000,000,000,000,000,000 (one million million million million million million; 1036) for all long scale countries

See also

 Names of large numbers